Van Schie is a Dutch toponymic surname meaning "from Schie", a canalized river between Delft and Schiedam. People with this name include:

 Lia van Schie (born 1970), Dutch speed skater
 Matt Van Schie, Australian bass guitarist, singer and namesake of the band Van She
 Peter van Schie (born 1988),  Dutch rower
 Tjako van Schie (born 1961), Dutch pianist and composer

References

Dutch-language surnames
Toponymic surnames
Surnames of Dutch origin